The Bengaluru Marathon is an annual marathon running event held in Bengaluru, India.

History

Crossover era 

Organized by Crossover Consulting, the full marathon race had about 200 participants, with about 400 runners joining the half marathon, and 15,000 taking part in the  Celebration Run. The marathon was won by Kennedy Chinna Ramu, a local 28-year-old man, with a time of 2:23:46, nearly five minutes faster than the runner-up.

The second marathon was scheduled for 17 September 2006. The winners were, in the full marathon men's division, H A Chinnappa, with a time of 2:35:19, in the full marathon women's division, Deepthi Ashok, with a time of 4:13:13, in the half marathon men's division, Irappa D Akki, with a time of 1:04:21, and in the half marathon women's division, K B with a time of 1:23:55.

Many marathoners, including the lead runners, had to run from barking dogs and take involuntary breaks due to traffic.

The Association of Road Racing Statisticians (ARRS) has no record of a marathon occurring in Bengaluru in 2008.

NEB Sports era 

It was organized by NEB Sports and members of the running community of Bengaluru.

The 2020 edition of the race was postponed to  due to the coronavirus pandemic.

Course 

The marathon is a double-loop course that begins and ends in Sree Kanteerava Stadium.  The course makes extensive use of Cubbon Park as well as Mahatma Gandhi Road and Cubbon Road.

Winners 

Key: Course record (in bold)

Crossover era

NEB Sports era

Notes

References

Marathons in India
Marathon
Recurring sporting events established in 2005
2005 establishments in Karnataka